Kibbelveen is a hamlet in the Netherlands and is part of the Coevorden municipality in Drenthe.

Kibbelveen is a statistical entity, but the postal authorities have placed it under Schoonoord. It was first mentioned in 1975, and means "bog which was disputed". The village cooperates with 't Haantje.

References

Coevorden
Populated places in Drenthe